Susan Lyons (born 1958, Sydney) is an Australian actress.

Her television appearances include: A Country Practice, Police Rescue, Murder Call, Farscape, Something in the Air and All Saints.

Her film appearances include: The Good Wife, No Worries,  In a Savage Land, Black and White, Corroboree, Martin Four and Napoleon.

Lyons starred in the 1998 Australian Christmas film Crackers, playing single mother Hilary who hates Christmas.

Her most recent credit in theatre includes work as an associate director on the 2004 Broadway production of I Am My Own Wife directed by    	
Moisés Kaufman. She has also narrated the audio book version of Incendiary, by Chris Cleave.

She is married to Tony Award-winning theatre and film actor Jefferson Mays.

Filmography 
FILM

TELEVISION

References

External links
 
Susan Lyons at the Internet Broadway Database

1958 births
Living people
Australian television actresses
21st-century Australian actresses
Australian film actresses
20th-century Australian actresses
Actresses from Sydney